Laura Pena Roldán (born 1 November 1979) is a former professional tennis player from Spain.

Biography
Pena grew up in Seville and was ranked in the world's top 50 as a junior. In 1996 she won the Spanish Tennis Championships.

On the professional tour, she reached a best ranking of 158 and won five ITF singles titles, three of which were $25,000 tournaments. She had her best year in 1997, when she qualified for WTA Tour main draws at Bol and Cardiff, as well as competing as a wildcard in the Madrid Open.

ITF finals

Singles (5–5)

Doubles (1–1)

References

External links
 
 

1979 births
Living people
Spanish female tennis players
Sportspeople from Seville
Tennis players from Andalusia